Lewisburg is a city in Greenbrier County, West Virginia, United States. The population was 3,930 at the 2020 census. It is the county seat of Greenbrier County.

Geography

Lewisburg is located approximately one mile north of the Greenbrier River.

Much of it is within the karst belt and a sinkhole is gated over at an intersection. It is part of the Davis Spring subwatershed. 

Lewisburg is part of the Southern West Virginia region.

Transportation 
Historic Lewisburg is centered at the crossroads of U.S. Route 60, historically called The Midland Trail, and U.S. Route 219.  Interstate 64's intersection with U.S. Route 219 near the northern border of the town has drawn most modern development into that area.

Greenbrier Valley Airport supports a vibrant general aviation community, and also has direct daily flights on United Airlines to hubs in Washington DC (IAD) and Chicago (ORD).

Climate
The climate in this area is characterized by hot, humid summers and generally mild to cool winters.  According to the Köppen Climate Classification system, Lewisburg has a humid subtropical climate, abbreviated "Cfa" on climate maps.

Demographics

2010 census
As of the census of 2010, there were 3,830 people, 1,892 households, and 989 families living in the city. The racial makeup of the city was 90.5% White, 5.4% African American, 0.3% Native American, 1.9% Asian, 0.1% Pacific Islander, 0.4% from other races, and 1.4% from two or more races. Hispanic or Latino of any race were 1.6% of the population.

There were 1,892 households, of which 20.2% had children under the age of 18 living with them, 41.3% were married couples living together, 8.2% had a female householder with no husband present, 2.7% had a male householder with no wife present, and 47.7% were non-families. 40.9% of all households were made up of individuals, and 18.8% had someone living alone who was 65 years of age or older. The average household size was 2.01 and the average family size was 2.73.

The median age in the city was 46.1 years. 17.7% of residents were under the age of 18; 8.5% were between the ages of 18 and 24; 22.5% were from 25 to 44; 27.3% were from 45 to 64; and 24.1% were 65 years of age or older. The gender makeup of the city was 46.6% male and 53.4% female.

2000 census
As of the census of 2000, there were 3,624 people, 1,746 households, and 1,000 families living in the city. The population density was 951.0 people per square mile (367.3/km2). There were 1,929 housing units at an average density of 506.2 per square mile (195.5/km2). The racial makeup of the city was 90.73% White, 6.68% African American, 0.44% Native American, 0.52% Asian, 0.36% from other races, and 1.27% from two or more races. Hispanic or Latino of any race were 0.66% of the population.

There were 1,746 households, out of which 20.5% had children under the age of 18 living with them, 46.6% were married couples living together, 8.6% had a female householder with no husband present, and 42.7% were non-families. 38.5% of all households were made up of individuals, and 19.4% had someone living alone who was 65 years of age or older. The average household size was 2.04 and the average family size was 2.69.

In the city, the population was spread out, with 17.8% under the age of 18, 6.8% from 18 to 24, 22.8% from 25 to 44, 28.3% from 45 to 64, and 24.2% who were 65 years of age or older. The median age was 47 years. For every 100 females, there were 79.1 males. For every 100 females age 18 and over, there were 74.3 males.

The median income for a household in the city was $27,857, and the median income for a family was $42,940. Males had a median income of $38,056 versus $21,386 for females. The per capita income for the city was $22,139, About 12.4% of families and 19.6% of the population were below the poverty line, including 21.2% of those under age 18 and 16.6% of those age 65 or over.

History

Lewisburg is named after Andrew Lewis. In 1751 Lewis, as a young surveyor, established a camp near the spring behind the present courthouse. This spring has been known as the Lewis Spring since that time. During Pontiac's Rebellion in 1763, Native Americans completely destroyed two of the early European settlements in Greenbrier County, killing the men and carrying off the women and children. This raid virtually eliminated all of the earliest settlers in the county. The Native Americans were primarily Shawnees, and (according to undocumented tradition) were led by the famous leader Hokoleskwa, or Cornstalk.

By 1770 a fortified encampment called Fort Savannah was established at the Lewis Spring. In 1774, Governor Dunmore of Virginia instructed then-Colonel Andrew Lewis to gather "willing and able men" to go to the great Kanawha River and stand against the Native American forces that were attacking the Greenbrier Valley. In what became known as Lord Dunmore's War, over 1,490 men were assembled, some at Fort Pitt at present-day Pittsburgh, and others at Fort Union, on the site of present-day Lewisburg.  These recruits included Lewis's brother Charles, and others which history books refer to as one of the most remarkable assemblages of frontier leaders in American history. Thirteen were men of political and military distinction. Lewis's army marched down the New and Kanawha Rivers to the Ohio River, where they intended to cross over and invade the Ohio Country, which was the home of the Shawnees.  The Native Americans, led by Cornstalk, attempted to cut them off at the mouth of the Kanawha, where they fought an inconclusive battle that came to be known as the Battle of Point Pleasant.

When the town of Lewisburg was formally laid out in 1780, Matthew Arbuckle, Sr. was the first settler. Among Lewisburg's first trustees was Col. John Stuart (1749-1823), a Revolutionary War commander who surveyed and settled the area and is known locally as the “Father of Greenbrier County”. The land on which the first county courthouse, and the Old Stone Church in Lewisburg, are situated was donated by Stuart. Lewisburg was formally established in 1782 by an act of the Virginia General Assembly. The original trustees were Samuel Lewis, James Reid, Samuel Brown, Andrew Donnelly, John Stuart, and Archer Mathews.
To accommodate Virginians west of the mountains, several Virginia courts sat in Lewisburg, where Patrick Henry once successfully defended a client accused of murder. The town and the surrounding farms prospered and a number of spas and resort hotels were established at some of the outlying mineral springs.

During the Civil War a number of engagements were fought in and around Lewisburg, including the 1862 Battle of Lewisburg. Several of the present buildings in town were used as hospitals and barracks by both sides in this conflict, and bullet marks can still be seen in some today. The Virginia Supreme Court library, which was located in Lewisburg and served as the Greenbrier County Library until 2008, was used as a hospital and has preserved a section of wall with soldiers' graffiti.

In the mid 20th century, the Lewisburg area was home to several children's summer camps. Camp Ann Bailey, (named after Revolutionary War scout Anne Bailey) was located on the Greenbrier River. This Girl Scout camp was integrated in the 1950s thanks to the efforts of Charleston civil rights activist Elizabeth Harden Gilmore. The camp operated between 1927 and 1974, when it was closed to permit construction of Interstate 64.  A boys' camp, Camp Shaw-Mi-Del-Eca, founded in 1929, was also located on the river. The two camps held joint activities, such as dances, with another nearby girls' camp, Camp Alleghany.

In 1978, a  area in the heart of Lewisburg was designated a National Register Historic District.

Today, Lewisburg is home to the West Virginia School of Osteopathic Medicine, one of 29 osteopathic medical schools in the United States and one of three medical schools in West Virginia.

Attractions and events

In 1902, steel baron and philanthropist Andrew Carnegie built Carnegie Hall as a classroom building for the Lewisburg Female Institute, later the Greenbrier College. Carnegie Hall, Inc. was incorporated in 1983 as a regional not-for-profit arts and education center. Today, the cultural center annually serves more than 75,000 patrons with live performances by artists from around the world, arts in education programming, classes, workshops, fine art exhibits, an independent film series and more. Carnegie Hall, Inc. is one of only four Carnegie Halls still in continuous use in the world.

The Greenbrier Historical Society and North House Museum is dedicated to collecting, preserving, and interpreting the rich history of the Greenbrier Valley. The Greenbrier Historical Society has operated within the North House since 1976 and has owned the building since 1992. Built in 1820, the North House was the home of local lawyer John North and his wife Charlotte for more than a decade before becoming James Frazier's Star Tavern and Inn.  At the turn of the 20th century, the North House became the President's home for Greenbrier Women's College. Today, the museum's permanent displays and temporary exhibits feature items from across the Greenbrier Valley, including, but not limit to; the training saddle of General Robert E. Lee's horse Traveller, an 18th-century covered wagon, Civil War artifacts, furniture made by local craftsman David Surbaugh, as well as original items from the North family. The Greenbrier Historical Society archives and museum hold artifacts from before the revolutionary war through today.  
The Greenbrier Historical Society and North House Museum also offers educational program, a research archive, group tour rates, and membership opportunities.

The Lewisburg post office holds a mural, Old Time Camp Meeting, painted by American artist Robert F. Gates as part of President Franklin Roosevelt's New Deal. The mural depicts a religious camp meeting, thought to be based on a local camp ground called Brushy Ridge.

The Lost World Caverns are nearby, and feature self-guided tours and numerous rock formations. Organ Cave is also in the area.

The State Fair of West Virginia is held in nearby Fairlea every August.

Lewisburg is the site of West Virginia's largest Martin Luther King Jr. Day celebration. The event includes a march through downtown Lewisburg, a community lunch, and a program commemorating the memory and legacy of Dr. King.

Belsnickle or Old Christmas is celebrated with the Shanghai Parade on New Year's Day. In this observation of the older traditions, people dress in costumes and march down the main street. Its term comes from "collie-shanghai", an old word related to making a lot of noise. The parade has been going on for over 150 years .

Other annual celebrations include two food festivals, Taste of Our Towns (TOOT) in October and the Chocolate Festival in April, and the Lewisburg Literary Festival, a celebration of books and the written word, held in August. Speakers at the Literary Festival have included Homer Hickam, author of Rocket Boys, Jeanette Walls, author of The Glass Castle, Garth Stein, author of The Art of Racing in the Rain, NBA basketball legend Jerry West, NPR's Noah Adams, West Virginia Poet Laureate and children's author Marc Harshman, and children's author Tom Angleberger of the Origami Yoda series. In 2013, musicians in the community created the West Virginia Winter Music Festival, as a fundraiser for musicians in need of financial support due to a life emergency. It has grown to be an anticipated event in the area every January.

The Greenbrier Classic Concert series are held in nearby Fairlea at the State Fair Grounds every July. Artists who have performed include West Virginia native Brad Paisley, Carrie Underwood, Keith Urban, Reba McEntire. Miranda Lambert, Rod Stewart, Lionel Richie, Victoria Justice, Jon Bon Jovi, Kenny Chesney, Aerosmith, Maroon 5 and Jimmy Buffett.

Notable people
 Cleve Benedict – former congressman, West Virginia Commissioner of Agriculture and US Undersecretary of Energy
 Pinckney Benedict – novelist, writer of short stories, and son of Cleve Benedict
 Vernell "Bimbo" Coles – Basketball Olympian, played for Miami Heat beginning in 1990
 Phillip Hamman – Soldier and scout, known as "The Savior of the Greenbrier".
 Brad Hoylman (born 1965) - New York State Senator
 Jim Justice – Governor of West Virginia 
 Robert Bruce King – Circuit Judge, United States Court of Appeals for the Fourth Circuit
 Gary W. Martini – Marine awarded the Medal of Honor for service in the Vietnam War, local bridge named in his honor
 Henry M. Mathews – former Governor of West Virginia. Member of the Mathews family
 Stuart Margolin - actor and director, best known for his work on "The Rockford Files"
 Johnny Olson – announcer, best known for his work on What's My Line?, Match Game, and The Price is Right
 Mason Patrick – United States Army general and air power advocate
 Colonel John Stuart – Pioneer and soldier, the "Father of Greenbrier County"

References

External links

 City of Lewisburg official web page

Cities in West Virginia
Cities in Greenbrier County, West Virginia
County seats in West Virginia
Populated places established in 1782
1782 establishments in Virginia